Aire Gap is a pass through the Pennines in England formed by geologic faults and carved out by glaciers. The term is used to describe a geological division, a travel route, or a location that is an entry into the Aire river valley.

Geology
Geologically the Aire Gap lies between the Craven Fault and the limestone uplands of the Yorkshire Dales to the north and the Forest of Bowland and the millstone grit moors of the South Pennines. The South Pennines is the system between the Aire Gap and the Peak District.
The gap was formed by the dropping of the Craven Faults in the Carboniferous through Jurassic periods combined with glacial scouring by ice sheets in the Pleistocene Ice Age.
The Aire Gap splits the Pennines into north and south by allying with the River Ribble. The Pennine chain is divided into two sections by the Aire Gap formed by the River Aire flowing south, a member of the Humber basin, and the Ribble flowing west and entering the Irish sea.

Geography
The term Aire Gap is used in both Ribblesdale and Pendle to denote a hypsograph (watershed) between those rivers and Airedale. Two locations are so described:
It is the watershed of that pass and lies between the "Little" North Western Railway and the A65 road.
 The head of Pendle Water valley culminates in Foulridge  near Colne. In literature Colne commonly describes itself as being in the Aire Gap. When the Leeds and Liverpool Canal was being constructed they dug a tunnel at altitude  beneath Foulridge's   to make a route even lower than the 160m pass near Hellifield.

Transport route

The Pennines form a natural barrier to east–west communications, but the Tyne Gap links Carlisle and Newcastle and the Aire Gap links Lancashire and Yorkshire.

Its extent is vague, a 19th-century author wrote:

The Aire Gap is of considerable strategic importance and historically Skipton Castle controlled the area. Skipton is now considered more central to the Aire Gap than terminal.

Topography

The treeless moorland gives no shelter and modern Pennine transport can find it a formidable barrier when roads are blocked by snow for several days. The Aire Gap route is a sheltered passageway, and inhabited along its length.
The Aire Gap was of topographic significance for the historic North of England providing a low-altitude pass through "the backbone of England". It was the Pennine transport corridor from Cumbria and Strathclyde to the Vale of York. Neolithic long-distance trade is proved by many finds of stone axes from central Cumbria.

References 

Yorkshire Dales
Geology of the Pennines
Geology of North Yorkshire